James Curtis DeBarge (born August 21, 1963) is an American R&B/soul singer. He was one of the members of the singing family vocal group DeBarge who became famous with their mid-1980s songs "All This Love", "Love Me in a Special Way", "Rhythm of the Night", and "Who's Holding Donna Now".

Early life and career 
He was the seventh child born to Robert DeBarge Sr. and Etterlene Abney DeBarge. Like all of his siblings, he was born and raised on the East Side of Detroit, Michigan. The family later relocated to Grand Rapids, Michigan. As of 2000, DeBarge has worked with DJ Quik on such tracks as "Tha Divorce Song", as well as "Get Nekkid" by slain rapper Mausberg. Also, in 2004, DeBarge made a song with the "Haitian Sensation" Won-G for a remix called "Nothing's Wrong", using the instrumental for the Quik/DeBarge track "Tha Divorce Song". Debarge also made a small guest appearance in 2006 on the album 818 Antics, by rapper J-Ro, who is associated with the rap group Tha Liks.

DeBarge 
James along with brothers Mark, Randy, nephew Andrew (bass player), and an unknown niece are performing on tour as DeBarge. They were featured in a "Flashback to the '80s" concert at San Manuel Casino in Highland, California along with Atlantic Starr, The SOS Band, and the Mary Jane Girls. In El's absence, James handled lead vocals. DeBarge performed three encores despite not being the top billed act.

Personal life 
DeBarge was also known for his 1984 marriage to pop singer Janet Jackson. The marriage was annulled in 1985 due to his addiction to pain killers and sleeping pills. During their marriage, they lived at the Jackson family home Hayvenhurst. In 2016, DeBarge claimed on Growing Up Hip-Hop that he and Jackson have a daughter. Jackson had previously told Vibe magazine in 2001, "They say the kid's in Europe or that one of my brothers or sisters is raising it .... But no, I've never had a child."

DeBarge has three children: daughter Kristinia (born March 8, 1990), son James, Jr. (born 1998), and his youngest, daughter Tori (born 2001).  Kristinia appeared on 2003's American Idol spin-off American Juniors, and later received a recording contract through Island Def Jam Records.

DeBarge performed with brothers El and Mark during a gospel service in late 2007. DeBarge is a practicing Christian.

In 2012 DeBarge was imprisoned after being arrested for assault with a deadly weapon and drugs charges. He was released from prison three years later in 2015.

Discography 

with DeBarge
 All This Love (1982)
 In a Special Way (1983)
 Rhythm of the Night (1985)
 Bad Boys (1987)

References 

1963 births
Living people
20th-century American singers
21st-century American singers
African-American male singers
American male singers
American soul singers
American tenors
DeBarge family
DeBarge members
Musicians from Grand Rapids, Michigan
Singers from Detroit
American people convicted of assault